Begu may refer to:

People
 Begu (nun) (died 690), English nun and saint
 Irina-Camelia Begu (born 1990), Romanian tennis player
  (born 1957), French rugby player

Places
 Begu, Ghana
 
 Begu Khel, Pakistan
 Begu River, Romania

Other
 Begu (grape)